The Royal Blind School is a specialist day and boarding school in Edinburgh, Scotland that was established in 1793 and run by the charity, Royal Blind. The school caters for pupils aged 3 to 19 who are blind or partially sighted, and has facilities for children of nursery, primary and secondary age. Students attending the school come primarily from Scotland, but also from other parts of the United Kingdom.

The school was divided into two campuses, both situated in Edinburgh. These were located in Canaan Lane and Craigmillar Park. The Craigmillar Park campus is for pupils who are blind and partially sighted, while the Canaan Lane campus caters for students with multiple disabilities. In August 2014, the two campuses combined into one and all of the children now attend the Canaan Lane campus.

In March 1997, the school featured in a documentary for ITV as part of its Network First strand. A follow up programme, Blind School Christmas Special was shown in December of that year.

History

Founded in 1793 the School formed from an amalgam of different Edinburgh institutions.

In 1825 it took on a residential element, caring for 25 blind women at a premises at 1 Hill Place. In 1876 the premises moved to a much larger, custom-built building, designed by Charles Leadbetter, off Craigmillar Park in the south of the city, merging with the 1835 School for Blind Children. In 1929 the school and residential elements split, under the Chairmanship of Rev Dr Thomas Burns, creating a solely residential element, the Thomas Burns Home, on Alfred Place. In 1946 Oswald House was purchased to supplement the residential care provision. In 1979 the home was extended to provide for male residents.

In 1991 a new home was opened on Canaan Lane and this was further supplemented in 1999 by Braeside House on Liberton Brae, aimed at the blind elderly and incorporating a sensory garden.

Notable alumni
 Dennis Robertson, Scottish National Party MSP for Aberdeenshire West
 Libby Clegg, paralympic sprinter
 James Clegg (swimmer), paralympic swimmer

See also
 Exhall Grange School
 Jordanstown Schools
 New College Worcester

References

External links

 
 History
 Royal Blind School at Scottish Council of Independent Schools

Educational institutions established in 1793
Secondary schools in Edinburgh
Primary schools in Edinburgh
Schools for the blind in the United Kingdom
Special schools in Scotland
1793 establishments in Scotland